Yves is a common French male given name of uncertain origin, either from Celtic as in the Gaulish name Ivo (Iuo) and compound names Ivorix (Iuo-rigi or Iue-ricci) and Ivomagus (Iuo-magi), all derived from the Gaulish term for yew, iuos or īuos, or from Germanic, derived from Proto-Germanic *īwaz, *īhwaz (compare Icelandic ýr), masculine variant of *īwō (compare Dutch ijf, German Eibe), from Proto-Indo-European *h₁eyHweh₂, meaning yew. Related names include Erwan[n] (though another etymology has been suggested), Evette, Ives, Ivet, Iveta, Ivette, Ivo, Iwo, Yve, Yvette (the feminine form of Yves), Yvo, Yvon, Yvonne, and many other diminutives (mainly from Brittany).

People with the given name

Actors
Yves Afonso (1944–2018), French actor
Yves Barsacq (1931–2015), French film actor
Yves Beneyton (born 1946), French actor
Yves Brainville (1914–1993), French film and television actor
Yves Jacques (born 1956), Canadian film, television and stage actor
Yves Montand (1921–1991), Italian-French singer and actor
Yves Pignot (born 1946), French actor
Yves Verhoeven (born 1961), French actor
Yves Vincent (1921–2016), French film and television actor

Artists
Yves Béhar (born 1967), Swiss designer, entrepreneur and an educator
Pierre-Yves Pelletier, Canadian graphic designer
Yves Chaland (1957–1990), French cartoonist and writer
Yves Klein (1928–1962), French artist
Yves Netzhammer (born 1970), Swiss artist
Yves Rodier (born 1967), Canadian cartoonist
Yves Saint Laurent (1936–2008), French fashion designer
Yves Tanguy (1900–1955), French surrealist painter
Yves Trudeau (artist) (1930–2017), Canadian sculptor and artist
Yves / Ha Soo-young (singer) (born 1997), South Korean singer, member of LOONA

Athletes
Pierre-Yves André (born 1974), French soccer-player
Yves Allegro (born 1978), Swiss tennis player
Yves Archambault (born 1952), Canadian ice hockey player
Yves Beaudoin  (born 1965), Canadian ice hockey player
Yves Bélanger (ice hockey) (born 1952), Canadian ice hockey player
Yves Bissouma (born 1996), Malian soccer-player
Yves Colleu (born 1961), French soccer-player
Yves Deroff (born 1978), French soccer-player
Yves Dignadice, Filipino basketball player
Yves Dreyfus (born 1931), French Olympic medalist épée fencer
Yves du Manoir (born 1904), French rugby player
Yves Edwards (born 1976), Bahamian mixed martial arts fighter
Yves Giraud-Cabantous (1904–1973), French racing driver
Yves Herbet (born 1945), French soccer-player and manager
Yves Lampaert (born 1991), Belgian cyclist
Yves Ma-Kalambay (born 1986), Belgian soccer-player
Yves Mankel (born 1970), German luger
Yves Parlier (born 1960), French sailor
Yves Racine (born 1969), Canadian ice hockey player
Yves Saint-Martin (born 1941), French jockey
Yves Sarault (born 1972), Canadian ice hockey player
Yves Triantafyllos, French-Greek soccer-player
Yves Vanderhaeghe (born 1970), Belgian soccer-player

Business people
Yves Béhar (born 1967), Swiss designer, entrepreneur, and educator
Yves Fortier (born 1935), Canadian lawyer, diplomat, and businessman
 Yves Guillemot, co-founder and CEO of Ubisoft
Yves Lamoureux, software entrepreneur
Yves Rocher (1930–2009), French cosmetics entrepreneur

Directors
Yves Allégret (1907–1987), French film director
Yves Caumon (born 1964), French film director
Yves Ciampi (1921–1982), French film director
Yves Lavandier (born 1959), French film director
Yves Pelletier (born 1961), Canadian director, actor, and comedian
Yves Robert (1920–2002), French director, actor, screenwriter, and producer
Yves Simoneau (born 1955), Canadian television director

Economists
Yves Balasko (born 1945), French economist
Yves Guyot (1843–1928), French economist and politician

Lawyers
St. Yves or Ivo of Chartres (1040–1114), French canon lawyer
St. Yves or Ivo of Kermartin (1253–1303), Breton lawyer and priest, patron saint of lawyers
Yves Bot (born 1947), French magistrate
Yves Lainé (born 1937), French lawyer and politician
Yves Pratte (1925–1988), Canadian lawyer and jurist

Musicians
Yves (born 1997), stage name of Ha Soo-young, of the South Korean girl group Loona
Yves Daoust (born 1946), Canadian composer and pianist
Yves Deruyter, Belgian DJ and artist
Yves Duteil (born 1949), singer, songwriter, and politician
Yves Nat (1890–1956), French composer and pianist
Yves Prin (born 1933), French composer, conductor, and pianist
Yves V (born Yves Van Geertsom in 1981), Belgian DJ and artist
DJ Whoo Kid (born Yves Mondesir in 1957), American DJ
Yves Tumor (born Sean Bowie), American music producer

Politicians
José Yves Limantour (1854–1935), Mexican politician, former Mexican Secretary of Finance
Yves-Marie Adeline (born 1960), French politician
Yves Bouthillier (1901–1977), French politician, former French Minister of Finance
Yves Cochet, French politician
Yves Ducharme (born 1958), Canadian politician and mayor
Yves Fauqueur (born 1948), prefect of Saint Pierre and Miquelon
Yves Guérin-Sérac, French politician and activist
Yves Lacoste (born 1929), French geographer and geopolitician
Yves Lessard (born 1943), Canadian politician
Yves Leterme (born 1960), Belgian politician
Yves Michaud (politician) (born 1930), Canadian politician in Quebec
Yves Prévost (1908–1997), Canadian politician and lawyer
Yves Rocheleau (born 1944), Canadian politician
Yves Séguin (born 1951), Canadian politician
Yves-François Blanchet (born 1965), Canadian politician

Scientists
Jacques-Yves Cousteau (1910–1997), French explorer, scientist and researcher
Yves Aubry, Canadian ornithologist
Yves Chauvin (born 1930), French chemist
Yves Colin de Verdière, French mathematician and physicist
Yves Coppens (born 1934), French anthropologist
Yves Delage (1854–1920), French zoologist
Yves Fortier (geologist) (born 1914), Canadian geologist
Yves Hemedinger (born 1965), French politician
Yves Laszlo, French mathematician
Yves Marie André (1675–1764), French mathematician and essayist
Yves Meyer (born 1939), French mathematician and scientist
Yves Morin (born 1929), Canadian cardiologist, physician, scientist, and former Senator
Yves Rocard (1903–1992), French physicist

Writers
Frédéric-Yves Jeannet (born 1959), French novelist, critic, and interviewer
Yves Beauchemin (born 1941), Canadian novelist
Yves Bonnefoy (1923–2016), French poet and essayist
Yves Engler, Canadian writer and political activist
Yves Frémion (born 1940), French science fiction writer
Yves Meynard (born 1964), Canadian science fiction and fantasy writer
Yves Thériault (1915–1983), Canadian writer
Yves Urvoy, French historian and writer
Yves Smith, American author

Other professions
Alexandre Saint-Yves d'Alveydre (1842–1909), French occultist
Yves Brunier (1962–1991), French landscape architect
Yves Chaudron, French art forger
Yves Congar (1904–1995), French Dominican priest and theologian
Yves Gagnon, Canadian ambassador to Argentina and Paraguay
Yves Godard (1911–1975), French soldier
Yves Le Prieur (1885–1963), French inventor and military man
Yves Leopold Germain Gaston, French patriarch
Yves-Joseph de Kerguelen-Trémarec (1734-1797), French Navy officer, namesake of Kerguelen Islands
Yves Mourousi (1942-1998), French journalist and news presenter
Yves Pouliquen (born 1931), French doctor
Yves Rossy (born 1959), Swiss pilot and inventor
Yves Simon (philosopher) (1903–1961), French Catholic philosopher
Yves Trudeau (biker) (1946–2008), prolific Canadian serial killer, mass murderer, and Hells Angel

Fictional characters
Yves Adele Harlow, a character in The X-Files
Yves Massarde, character in the Clive Cussler novel and film Sahara
Yves, a criminal cat in a recurring sketch in the latter episodes of Dog City
Yves Benedict, a character in Julia Golding's Finding Sky trilogy

See also 

Jean-Yves

References

French masculine given names
Given names derived from plants or flowers